Vainio is a Finnish surname meaning "field". Notable people with the surname include:

Aaro Vainio (born 1993), Finnish race driver
Jaakko Vainio (1892–1953), Finnish journalist and politician
Jouni Vainio (born 1960), Finnish Olympian sport shooter
Juha Vainio (1938–1990), Finnish musician
Martti Vainio (born 1950), Finnish long-distance runner
Mikko Vainio (1923–2017), Finnish politician
Vihtori Vainio (1890–1942), Finnish politician

Finnish-language surnames